Tough may refer to:
 Toughness, the resistance to fracture of a material when stressed
 Machismo, prominently exhibited or excessive masculinity 
 Psychological resilience
Tough may also refer to:

People
 Allen Tough (1936–2012), Canadian academic
 Dave Tough (1907–1948), jazz drummer
 The Krankies, Ian and Janette Tough
 Kathy Tough (born 1969), Canadian volleyball player
 Kelly Tough (b. 1967), Canadian model and actress
 Paul Tough (born 1967), Canadian writer
 Jim Barry (c. 1891–1967), aka Tough Barry, Cork hurling coach

Music
 Tough (John Mayall album), 2009
 Tough (Kurtis Blow album), 1982
 Tough (Wishbone Ash album), 2008
 Tough!, 1966 album by Art Blakey
 "Tough" (Craig Morgan song), 2007
 "Tough" (Kellie Pickler song), 2011
 "Tough" (Lewis Capaldi song), 2018
 "Tough", 1960 single by The Bill Smith Combo

Other
 Tough (film)
 Kirkton of Tough, settlement in Aberdeenshire, Scotland
 Tough (manga)
 The Tough, 1957 Egyptian film
 T-ough Press, underground Russian publisher

See also 
 Tuff
 Tough movement, in formal syntax, movement of the object in construction like "the problem is tough to solve"